Major William Bryan Robertson (October 8, 1893 – August 1, 1943) was an American aviator and aviation executive who was the co-founder of Lambert-St. Louis Flying Field as well as the owner and President of  Robertson Aircraft Corporation (RAC) located there, a company which he had co-founded with his brother, Frank, in 1918.

RAC provided a wide range of aviation services as well as having operated Contract Air Mail service from St. Louis to Chicago (CAM-2) beginning in 1926. Along with the St. Louis Chamber of Commerce, in 1927 Robertson backed his chief Air Mail pilot, Charles Lindbergh, to compete in the Orteig Prize and funded the design and construction of his aircraft, the Spirit of St. Louis, for the New York-Paris flight.

Biography
Robertson was born on October 8, 1893 in Nashville, Tennessee.

In 1924, Major Robertson became the first commanding officer of the Missouri National Guard Air Unit 35th Division, Aviation Section operating out of Lambert field with eight Curtiss JN-4 "Jenny" aircraft. The unit which Robertson commanded is the ancestor of the Missouri Air National Guard's 110th Bomb Squadron, which is part of the 131st Bomb Wing.

In 1927, Robertson left Robertson Aircraft Corporation and formed an interest with the Curtiss-Wright corporation. This created a division named Curtiss-Robertson Airplane Manufacturing Company to build the Curtiss-Robertson Robin aircraft. Robertson left the company in 1933 when it merged into Curtiss-Wright. 

In November 1929, the small town of Anglum, Missouri, located adjacent to Lambert Field, was renamed Robertson in honor of his contributions to aviation.

On August 1, 1943, a WACO CG-4A military troop and cargo transport glider built under license by RAC crashed at Lambert Field in St. Louis during a demonstration flight. The crash killed all ten on board, including Maj. Robertson. Robertson's then 17-year-old son, James, was a passenger in a successful flight of the glider made immediately before the fatal flight.

References

1893 births
1943 deaths
Accidental deaths in Missouri
Airline founders
Aviators from Tennessee
Aviators killed in aviation accidents or incidents in the United States
People from Nashville, Tennessee
Victims of aviation accidents or incidents in 1943
Burials at Bellefontaine Cemetery